The M4 Sherman, officially Medium Tank, M4, was the most widely used medium tank by the United States and Western Allies in World War II. The M4 Sherman proved to be reliable, relatively cheap to produce, and available in great numbers. It was also the basis of several other armored fighting vehicles including self-propelled artillery, tank destroyers, and armored recovery vehicles. Tens of thousands were distributed through the Lend-Lease program to the British Commonwealth and Soviet Union. The tank was named by the British after the American Civil War General William Tecumseh Sherman.

The M4 Sherman evolved from the M3 Medium Tank, which for speed of development had its main armament in a side sponson mount. The M4 retained much of the previous mechanical design, but moved the main 75 mm gun into a fully traversing central turret. One feature, a one-axis gyrostabilizer, was not precise enough to allow firing when moving but did help keep the gun aimed in roughly the right direction for when the tank stopped to fire. The designers stressed reliability, ease of production and maintenance, durability, standardization of parts and ammunition in a limited number of variants, and moderate size and weight (to facilitate shipping and for compatibility with existing bridging equipment size and weight limit restrictions.). These factors, combined with Sherman's then-superior armor and armament, outclassed German light and medium tanks fielded in 1939–42. The M4 was the most-produced tank in American history, with 49,324 produced (including variants); During World War II, the Sherman spearheaded many offensives by the Allies after 1942.

When the M4 tank went into combat in North Africa with the British Army at the Second Battle of El Alamein in late 1942, it increased the advantage of Allied armor over Axis armor and was superior to the lighter German and Italian tank designs. For this reason, the US Army believed that the M4 would be adequate to win the war, and relatively little pressure was initially exerted for further tank development. Logistical and transport restrictions, such as limitations imposed by roads, ports, and bridges, also complicated the introduction of a more capable but heavier tank. Tank destroyer battalions using vehicles built on the M4 hull and chassis, but with open-topped turrets and more potent high-velocity guns, also entered widespread use in the Allied armies. Even by 1944, most M4 Shermans kept their dual-purpose 75 mm gun. By then, the M4 was inferior in firepower and armor to increasing numbers of German upgraded medium tanks and heavy tanks but was able to fight on with the help of considerable numerical superiority, greater mechanical reliability, better logistical support, and support from growing numbers of fighter-bombers and artillery pieces. Later in the war a more effective armor-piercing gun, the 76 mm gun M1, was incorporated into production vehicles. For anti-tank work, British refitted Shermans with a 76.2 mm Ordnance QF 17-pounder gun (as the Sherman Firefly). Some were fitted with a 105 mm gun to act as infantry support vehicles.

The relative ease of production allowed large numbers of the M4 to be manufactured, and significant investment in tank recovery and repair units allowed disabled vehicles to be repaired and returned to service quickly. These factors combined to give the Allies numerical superiority in most battles, and many infantry divisions were provided with M4s and tank destroyers. By 1944, a typical U.S. infantry division had attached for armor support an M4 Sherman battalion, a tank destroyer battalion, or both.

After World War II, the Sherman, particularly the many improved and upgraded versions, continued to see combat service in many conflicts around the world, including the U.N forces in the Korean War, with Israel in the Arab–Israeli wars, briefly with South Vietnam in the Vietnam War, and on both sides of the Indo-Pakistani War of 1965.

U.S. design prototype

The United States Army Ordnance Department designed the M4 medium tank as a replacement for the M3 medium tank. The M3 was an up-gunned development of the M2 Medium Tank of 1939, in turn, derived from the M2 light tank of 1935. The M3 was developed as a stopgap measure until a new turret mounting a 75 mm gun could be devised. While it was a big improvement when used by the British in Africa against German forces, the placement of a 37 mm gun turret on top gave it a very high profile, and the unusual side-sponson mounted main gun, with limited traverse, could not be aimed across the other side of the tank. Though reluctant to adopt British weapons into their arsenal, the American designers were prepared to accept proven British ideas. These ideas, as embodied in a tank designed by the Canadian General Staff, also influenced the development of the American Sherman tank. Before long American military agencies and designers had accumulated sufficient experience to forge ahead on several points. In the field of tank armament, the American 75 mm and 76 mm dual-purpose tank guns won the acknowledgment of British tank experts. Detailed design characteristics for the M4 was submitted by the Ordnance Department on 31 August 1940, but the development of a prototype was delayed while the final production designs of the M3 were finished and the M3 entered full-scale production. On 18 April 1941, the U.S. Armored Force Board chose the simplest of five designs. Known as the T6, the design was a modified M3 hull and chassis, carrying a newly designed turret mounting the M3's 75 mm gun. This would later become the Sherman.

The Sherman's reliability resulted from many features developed for U.S. light tanks during the 1930s, including vertical volute spring suspension, rubber-bushed tracks, and a rear-mounted radial engine with drive sprockets in front. The goals were to produce a fast, dependable medium tank able to support infantry, provide breakthrough striking capacity, and defeat any tank then in use by the Axis nations.

The T6 prototype was completed on 2 September 1941. The upper hull of the T6 was a single large casting. It featured a single overhead hatch for the driver and a hatch in the side of the hull. In the later M4A1 production model, this large casting was maintained, although the side hatch was eliminated and a second overhead hatch was added for the assistant driver. The modified T6 was standardized as the M4, and production began in February 1942. The cast-hull models would later be re-standardized as M4A1, with the first welded-hull models receiving the designation M4. In August 1942, a variant of the M4 was put forth by the Detroit Arsenal to have angled, rather than rounded hull and turret armor. The changes were intended to improve the tank's protection without increasing weight or degrading other technical characteristics.

Doctrine

As the United States approached entry into World War II, armored employment was doctrinally governed by Field Manual 100–5, Operations (published May 1941, the month following selection of the M4 tank's final design). That field manual stated:

The M4 was, therefore, not originally intended primarily as an infantry support tank. It placed tanks in the "striking echelon" of the armored division, and placed the infantry in the "support echelon", without directing that tanks should only seek to attack other tanks, thus leaving target selection up to the field commander based on what types of units were available to him to attack. A field manual covering the use of the Sherman (FM 17–33, "The Tank Battalion, Light and Medium" of September 1942) described fighting enemy tanks when necessary as one of the many roles of the Sherman, but devoted only one page of text and four diagrams to tank-versus-tank action, out of 142 pages. This early armored doctrine was heavily influenced by the sweeping early war successes of German blitzkrieg tactics. By the time M4s reached combat in significant numbers, battlefield demands for infantry support and tank versus tank action far outnumbered the occasional opportunities of rear-echelon exploitation. 

United States doctrine held that the most critical anti-tank work stopping massed enemy tank attacks was primarily to be done by towed and self-propelled anti-tank guns, operated by "Tank Destroyer" battalions, with friendly tanks being used in support if possible. Speed was essential to bring the tank destroyers from the rear to destroy incoming tanks. This doctrine was rarely followed in combat, as it was found to be impractical. Commanders were reluctant to leave tank destroyers in reserve; if they were, it was also easier for an opposing armored force to achieve a breakthrough against an American tank battalion, which would not have all of its anti-tank weapons at the front during the beginning of any attack.

U.S. production history

The first production of the Sherman took place at the Lima Locomotive Works, with many early vehicles reserved for British use under Lend-Lease; the first production Sherman was given to the U.S. Army for evaluation, and the second tank of the British order went to London. Nicknamed Michael, probably after Michael Dewar, head of the British tank mission in the U.S., the tank was displayed in London and is now an exhibit at The Tank Museum, Bovington, UK.

In World War II, the U.S. Army ultimately fielded 16 armored divisions, along with 70 separate tank battalions, while the U.S. Marine Corps fielded six tank battalions. A third of all Army tank battalions, and all six Marine tank battalions, were deployed to the Pacific Theater of Operations (PTO). Before September 1942, President Franklin D. Roosevelt had announced a production program calling for 120,000 tanks for the Allied war effort. Although the American industrial complex was not affected by enemy aerial bombing or submarine warfare as was Japan, Germany and, to a lesser degree, Great Britain, an enormous amount of steel for tank production was diverted to the construction of warships and other naval vessels. Steel used in naval construction amounted to the equivalent of approximately 67,000 tanks; and consequently, only about 53,500 tanks were produced during 1942 and 1943.

The Army had seven main sub-designations for M4 variants during production: M4, M4A1, M4A2, M4A3, M4A4, M4A5, and M4A6. These designations did not necessarily indicate linear improvement; in that "M4A4" did not indicate it was better than "M4A3". These sub-types indicated standardized production variations, which were in fact often manufactured concurrently at different locations. The sub-types differed mainly in engines, although the M4A1 differed from the other variants by its fully cast upper hull, with a distinctive rounded appearance. The M4A4 had a longer engine that required a longer hull and more track blocks, and thus the most distinguishing feature of the M4A4 was the wider longitudinal spacing between the bogies. "M4A5" was an administrative placeholder designation for Canadian production. The M4A6 had a radial diesel engine as well as the elongated chassis of the M4A4, but only 75 of these were ever produced.

Most Sherman sub-types ran on gasoline. The air-cooled Continental-produced Wright R-975 Whirlwind 9 cylinder radial gasoline engine in the M4 and M4A1 produced . The M4A3 used the liquid-cooled  Ford GAA V8 gasoline engine, and the M4A4 used the liquid-cooled  30 cylinder Chrysler A57 multibank gasoline engine. There were also two diesel-engined variants. A 24-volt electrical system was used in the M4. The M4A2 and M4A4 were mostly supplied to other Allied countries under Lend-Lease. 

The term "M4" can refer specifically to the initial sub-type with its Continental radial engine, or generically, to the entire family of seven Sherman sub-types, depending on context. Many details of production, shape, strength, and performance improved while in production, without a change to the tank's basic model number. These included stronger suspension units, safer "wet" (W) ammunition stowage, and stronger or more effective armor arrangements, such as the M4 "Composite", which had a cheaper to produce cast front hull section mated to a regular welded rear hull. British nomenclature for Shermans was by mark numbers for the different hulls with letters for differences in armament and suspension: A for a vehicle with the 76 mm gun, B for the 105 mm howitzer, C for the 17pdr gun, and Y for any vehicle equipped with HVSS; eg British operated M4A1(76) was known as Sherman IIA.

Early Shermans mounted a 75 mm medium-velocity general-purpose gun. Although Ordnance began work on the T20/22/23 series as Sherman replacements, the Army Ground Forces were satisfied with the M4 and Armored Force Board considered some features of the experimental tanks unsatisfactory. Continuing with M4 minimized production disruption but elements of the experimental designs were incorporated into the Sherman. Later M4A1, M4A2, and M4A3 models received the larger turret with high-velocity 76 mm gun trialled on the T23 tank. The first standard-production 76 mm gun-armed Sherman was an M4A1, accepted in January 1944, which first saw combat in July 1944 during Operation Cobra. Variants of the M4 and M4A3 were factory-produced with a 105 mm howitzer and a distinctive rounded gun mantlet, which surrounded the main gun, on the turret. The first Sherman variant to be armed with the 105 mm howitzer was the M4, first accepted in February 1944.

From May to July 1944, the Army accepted a limited run of 254 M4A3E2 "Jumbo" Shermans, which had very thick hull armor and the 75 mm gun in a new, better-protected T23-style turret ("Jumbos" could mount the 76 mm M1 cannon), to assault fortifications, leading convoys, and spearhead armored columns. The M4A3 model was the first to be factory-produced with the horizontal volute spring suspension (HVSS) system with wider tracks to distribute weight, beginning in August 1944. With the smooth ride of the HVSS, it gained the nickname "Easy Eight" from its experimental "E8" designation. The M4 and M4A3 105 mm-armed tanks, as well as the M4A1 and M4A2 76 mm-armed tanks, were also eventually equipped with HVSS. Both the Americans and the British developed a wide array of special attachments for the Sherman, although few saw combat, remaining experimental. Those that saw action included a bulldozer blade, the Duplex Drive system, flamethrowers for Zippo flame tanks, and various rocket launchers such as the T34 Calliope. British variants (DDs and mine flails) formed part of the group of specialized vehicles collectively known as "Hobart's Funnies" (after Percy Hobart, commander of the 79th Armoured Division).

The M4 Sherman's basic chassis was used for all the sundry roles of a modern mechanized force. These included the M10 and M36 tank destroyers; M7B1, M12, M40, and M43 self-propelled artillery; the M32 and M74 "tow truck"-style recovery tanks with winches, booms, and an 81 mm mortar for smoke screens; and the M34 (from M32B1) and M35 (from M10A1) artillery prime movers.

Service history

Allocation

During World War II, approximately 19,247 Shermans were issued to the U.S. Army and about 1,114 to the U.S. Marine Corps. The U.S. also supplied 17,184 to United Kingdom (some of which in turn went to the Canadians and the Free Poles), while the Soviet Union received 4,102 and an estimated 812 were transferred to China. These numbers were distributed further to the respective countries' allied nations.

The U.S. Marine Corps used the diesel M4A2 and gasoline-powered M4A3 in the Pacific. However, the Chief of the Army's Armored Force, Lt. Gen. Jacob L. Devers, ordered that no diesel-engined Shermans be used by the Army outside the Zone of Interior (the continental U.S.). The Army used all types for either training or testing within the United States but intended the M4A2 and M4A4 (with the A57 Multibank engine) to be the primary Lend-Lease exports.

First combat
Shermans were being issued in small numbers for familiarization to U.S. armored divisions when there was a turn of events in the Western Desert campaign. Axis forces had taken Tobruk and were advancing into Egypt and Britain's supply line through the Suez Canal was threatened. The US considered collecting all Shermans together to be able to send the 2nd Armored Division under Patton to reinforce Egypt, but delivering the Shermans directly to the British was quicker and over 300 – mostly M4A1s, but also including M4A2s – had arrived there by September 1942.

The Shermans were modified for desert warfare with shields over the tracks and another stowage. The Sherman first saw combat at the Second Battle of El Alamein in October 1942 with the British 8th Army. At the start of the offensive, there were 252 tanks fit for action. These equipped the British 9th Armoured Brigade (for the battle under the New Zealand Division), 2nd Armoured Brigade (1st Armoured Division), and 8th and 20th Armoured Brigades (10th Armoured Division). There were losses to both sides.

The first U.S. Shermans in battle were M4s and M4A1s in Operation Torch the following month. On 6 December, near Tebourba, Tunisia, a platoon from the 2nd Battalion, 13th Armored Regiment was lost to enemy tanks and anti-tank guns.

Additional M4s and M4A1s replaced M3s in U.S. tank battalions over the course of the North African campaign.

The M4 and M4A1 were the main types in U.S. units until the fall of 1944 when the Army began replacing them with the preferred M4A3 with its more powerful  engine. Some M4s and M4A1s continued in U.S. service for the rest of the war. The first Sherman to enter combat with the 76 mm gun in July 1944 was the M4A1, then the M4A2, closely followed by the M4A3. By the end of the war, roughly half the U.S. Army Shermans in Europe had the 76 mm gun. The first HVSS-equipped Sherman to see combat was the M4A3(76)W in December 1944.

Eastern Front

Under Lend-Lease, 4,102 M4A2 medium tanks were sent to the Soviet Union. Of these, 2,007 were equipped with the original 75 mm main gun, with 2,095 mounting the more-capable 76 mm gun. The total number of Sherman tanks sent to the USSR under Lend-Lease represented 18.6% of all Lend-Lease Shermans. The first 76 mm-armed M4A2 Shermans started to arrive in the Soviet Union in the late summer of 1944.

The Red Army considered the M4A2 to be much less prone to catch fire due to ammunition detonation than the T-34/76, but the M4A2 had a higher tendency to overturn in road accidents and collisions or because of rough terrain than the T-34 due to its higher center of gravity.

By 1945, some Red Army armored units were equipped entirely with the Sherman. Such units included the 1st Guards Mechanized Corps, the 3rd Guards Mechanized Corps and the 9th Guards Mechanized Corps, amongst others. According to Soviet tanker Dmitriy Loza, the Sherman was held in good regard and viewed positively by many Soviet tank crews, with compliments given to its reliability, ease of maintenance, generally good firepower (referring especially to the 76 mm gun version) as well as an auxiliary power unit (APU) to keep the tank's batteries charged without having to run the main engine, as was required on the T-34.  However, according to Soviet tank crews, the Sherman also had disadvantages, the greatest being its high center of gravity and the ease of hitting it by enemy fire.  The Sherman’s relatively narrow-set tracks struggled to negotiate muddy terrain compared to the wider-set tracks of the T-34 or German Panther tank.

Pacific Theater

While combat in the European theater often consisted of high-profile armored warfare, the mainly naval nature of the Pacific Theater of Operations (PTO) relegated it to secondary status for both the Allies and the Japanese.  While the U.S. Army fielded 16 armored divisions and 70 separate tank battalions during the war, only a third of the battalions and none of the divisions were deployed to the Pacific Theater.  The Imperial Japanese Army (IJA) deployed only their 2nd Tank Division to the Pacific during the war.  Armor from both sides mostly operated in jungle terrain that was poorly suited to armored warfare.  For this type of terrain, the Japanese and the Allies found light tanks easier to transport and employ.
During the early stages of combat in the Pacific, specifically, the Guadalcanal Campaign, the U.S. Marine Corps' M2A4 light tank fought against the equally-matched Type 95 Ha-Go light tank; both were armed with a 37 mm main gun. However, the M2 (produced in 1940) was newer by five years. By 1943, the IJA still used the Type 95 and Type 97 Chi-Ha medium tanks, while Allied forces were quickly replacing their light tanks with 75 mm-armed M4s. The Chinese in India received 100 M4 Shermans and used them to great effect in the subsequent 1944 and 1945 offensives in the China Burma India Theater.

To counter the Sherman, the Japanese developed the Type 3 Chi-Nu and the heavier Type 4 Chi-To; both tanks were armed with 75 mm guns, albeit of different type. Only 166 Type 3s and two Type 4s were built, and none saw combat; they were saved for the defense of the Japanese home islands, leaving 1930s era light and medium armor to do battle against 1940s built Allied light and medium armor.

During the later years of the war, general purpose high explosive ammunition was preferred for fighting Japanese tanks because armor-piercing rounds, which had been designed for penetrating thicker steel, often went through the thin armor of the Type 95 Ha-Go (the most commonly encountered Japanese tank) and out the other side without stopping. Although the high-velocity guns of tank destroyers were useful for penetrating fortifications, M4s armed with flamethrowers were often deployed, as direct fire seldom destroyed Japanese fortifications.

Korean War

During the Korean War, the M4A3E8 Easy Eight was the main tank force of the U.S. military until the signing of the armistice agreement.

At the outbreak of the war, the U.S. military tried to deploy the M4A3E8, a medium-sized tank of the same class, to respond to North Korean T-34-85, but there were few tanks available for rapid deployment from the Far East due to disarmament after World War II. The U.S. Far East Command collected 58 M4A3E8 scattered throughout Japan, created the 8072nd Temporary Tank Battalion (later renamed to the 89th Tank Battalion) on July 17 and landed them in Busan on August 1. The 8072nd Temporary Tank Battalion was immediately deployed for Battle of Masan to support the 25th U.S. Infantry Division.

Since then, a total of 679 M4A3E8 were deployed on the Korean Peninsula in 1950. The M4A3E8 and T-34-85 were comparable and could destroy each other at normal combat ranges, although the use of High-Velocity Armor Piercing ammunition, advanced optics, and better crew training gave the Sherman an advantage. The M4A3E8, using 76 mm HVAP ammunition, destroyed 41 enemy tanks from July to November 1950.

The M4A3E8 had weaker anti-tank combat capability compared to the larger caliber M26 Pershing and the M46 Patton that were operated at the same time. However, the lighter M4A3E8 became the preferred U.S. tank in the later phases of the war. It was considered more advantageous in terms of maneuverability on rough terrain and ease of maintenance due to the mechanical reliability. Because of this feature, the M4A3E8 were widely used for providing close support to infantry units, particularly during battles for high ground and mountains.

From December 1951, around 20 M4A3E8s saw service with the Republic of Korea Marine Corps during the war while the Army operated M36 GMCs as its main armored asset.

Other uses
After World War II, the U.S. kept the M4A3E8 Easy Eight in service, with either the 76 mm gun or a 105 mm M4 howitzer. The U.S. Army replaced the M4 in 1957, in favor of the M47 Patton, M48 Patton and, M60 Patton. The U.S. continued to transfer Shermans to its allies, which contributed to widespread foreign use. 

The Israeli Defense Force used Shermans from its creation in 1948 until the 1980s, having first acquired a single M4A2 lacking the main armament from British forces as they withdrew from Israel. The popularity of the tank (having now been re-armed) compared to the outdated, 1934-origin French Renault R35 interwar light tanks with their 37 mm short-barreled guns, which made up the bulk of the IDF's tank force, led to the purchase of 30 unarmed M4(105 mm)s from Italian scrapyards. Three of these, plus the original M4A2, saw extensive service in the 1948-9 war of independence. The remainder were then serviced and rearmed with 75 mm guns and components whenever these became available, composing a large part of Israeli tank forces for the next eight years. The 75 mm-armed Shermans were replaced by M4A1 (76 mm) Shermans imported from France before the 1956 Suez Crisis after it was realized that their armor penetration was insufficient for combat against newer tanks such as the IDF Centurions as well as the T-34-85s being delivered to Egyptian forces. During further upgrades, the French military helped develop a conversion kit to upgrade about 300 Shermans to the long high-velocity 75 mm gun CN 75-50 used in the AMX-13. These were designated Sherman M-50 by the Israelis. Before the Six-Day War in 1967, the Israeli Army upgraded about 180 M4A1(76)W HVSS Shermans with the French 105 mm Modèle F1 gun, re-engined them with Cummins diesel engines, and designated the upgraded tank Sherman M-51. The Sherman tanks, fighting alongside the 105 mm Centurion Shot Kal and M48 Patton tanks, were able to defeat the T-34-85, T-54/55/62 series, and IS-3 tanks used by the Egyptian and Syrian forces in the 1967 Six-Day War.

M4A3s were also used by British forces in Indonesia during the Indonesian National Revolution until 1946 when they were passed on to the KNIL, which used them until 1949 before they were passed on to the Indonesian National Armed Forces.

Armament

Gun development
As the Sherman was being designed, provisions were made so that multiple types of main armament (specified as a 75 mm gun, a 3-inch gun, or a 105 mm howitzer) could be mounted in the turret. The possibility of mounting the main gun of the M6 heavy tank, the 3-inch gun M7, in the turret of the M4 Sherman was explored first, but its size and weight (the weapon was modified from a land-based antiaircraft gun) made it too large to fit in the turret of the Sherman. Development on a new 76 mm gun better-suited to the Sherman began in fall 1942.

In early 1942, tests began on the feasibility of mounting a 105 mm howitzer into the turret of the Sherman. The basic 105 mm howitzer M2A1 was found to be ill-designed for mounting in a tank turret, so it was completely redesigned and re-designated the 105 mm howitzer M4. After modifications to the turret (concerning the balancing of the gun and the strength of the power traverse) and interior of the hull (concerning the stowage of the 105 mm ammunition), the Ordnance Department expressed its approval of the project, and production of M4 tanks armed with 105 mm howitzers began in February 1944.

Facing the early Panzer III and Panzer IV in North Africa, the Sherman's gun could penetrate the frontal armor of these tanks at normal combat ranges, within . U.S. Army Intelligence discounted the arrival of the Tiger I in 1942 and the Panther tank in 1943, predicting that the Panther would be a heavy tank like the Tiger I, and doubted that many would be produced. There were also reports of British QF 6 pdr (57 mm) guns being able to destroy the Tiger I. However, this only happened at very close ranges and against the thinner side armor. Due to their misconceptions related to this, and also due to tests that seemed to prove that the 76 mm gun was able to destroy both the Tiger and the Panther, the leadership of Army Ground Forces were not especially concerned by the Tiger I. The criteria and results of the 76 mm gun tests were later ruled to have been inaccurate when compared to real-world conditions (tests against sections of American armor plate configured to resemble those found on a Panther tank suggested that the new M1A1 gun would be adequate, but testing against actually captured Panther tanks was never done), with Eisenhower even remarking that he was wrongly told by Ordnance that the 76 mm could knock out any German tank. The Army also failed to anticipate that the Germans would attempt to make the Panther the standard tank of their panzer divisions in 1944, supported by small numbers of Tiger I and IIs.

When the newly-designed 76 mm gun, known as the T1, was first installed in the M4 in spring 1943, it was found to unbalance the turret, and the gun barrel also protruded too far forward, making it more difficult to transport and susceptible to hitting the ground when the tank traveled over undulating terrain. Mounting this gun in the original M4 turret proved problematic, so the turret for the aborted T23 tank project was used instead for the definitive production version of the 76 mm M4 Shermans, along with a modified version of the gun known as the M1A1.

Despite the Ordnance Department's development of new 76 mm and 90 mm anti-tank guns, the Army Ground Forces rejected their deployment as unnecessary. An attempt to upgrade the M4 Sherman by installing the 90 mm-armed turret from the T26 tank project on an M4 hull in April 1944 was halted after realizing it could not go into production sooner than the T26 and would likely delay T26 development. Even in 1943, most German armored fighting vehicles (later models of the Panzer IV tank, StuG III assault gun and Marder III panzerjaeger self-propelled anti-tank gun) mounted the 7.5 cm KwK 40. As a result, even weakly armored light German tank destroyers such as the Marder III, which was meant to be a stop-gap measure to fight Soviet tanks in 1942, could destroy Shermans from a distance. The disparity in firepower between the German armored fighting vehicles that began to be fielded in 1943 and the 75 mm-armed M4 was the impetus to begin production of 76 mm-armed M4s in January 1944. In testing before the invasion of Normandy, the 76 mm gun was found to have an undesirably large muzzle blast that kicked up dust from the ground and obscured vision for further firing. The M1A1C gun, which entered production lines in March 1944, was threaded for a muzzle brake, but as the brakes were still in development, the threads were protected with a cap. The addition of a muzzle brake on the new M1A2 gun (which also incorporated a faster rifling twist leading to a slight accuracy increase at longer ranges) beginning in October 1944 finally solved this problem by directing the blast sideways.

Army doctrine at the time emphasized the multirole ability of the tank, and the capability of the high explosive shell was considered important. Being a dedicated anti-tank gun, the 76 mm had a much weaker high explosive shell than the existing 75 mm, and was not initially accepted by various U.S. armored division commanders, even though many had already been produced and were available. All of the U.S. Army M4s deployed initially in Normandy in June 1944 had the 75 mm gun. Fighting against Panther tanks in Normandy quickly demonstrated the need for better anti-tank firepower, and the 76 mm M4s were deployed to First Army units in July 1944. Operation Cobra was the combat debut of the 76 mm gun-armed Sherman, in the form of the M4A1(76)W. General George S. Patton's Third Army were initially issued 75 mm M4s and accepted 76 mm-armed M4s only after the Battle of Arracourt against Panther tanks in late September 1944.

The higher-velocity 76 mm gun gave Shermans anti-tank firepower equal to many of the German vehicles they encountered, particularly the Panzer IV and StuG III, but its gun was inferior to that of the Tiger or the Panther. The 76 mm was capable of knocking out a Panther at normal combat ranges from the flanks or rear, but could not overcome the glacis plate. An M4 might only knock out a Panther frontally from point-blank range by aiming for its turret front and transverse-cylindrical shaped mantlet, the lower edge of which on most Panthers (especially the earlier Ausf. D and A versions) constituted a vulnerable shot trap. A 76 mm-armed Sherman could penetrate the upper frontal hull superstructure of a Tiger I tank from normal combat ranges.

In late summer 1944, after breaking out of the bocage and moving into open country, U.S. tank units that engaged German defensive positions at longer ranges sometimes took 50% casualties before spotting where the fire was coming from. Sherman crews also had concerns about firing from longer ranges, as Sherman's high-flash powder made their shots easier to spot. This, and the U.S. Army's usual offensive tactical situation, often contributed to losses suffered by the U.S. Army in Europe. Even though the various gunsights fitted to the Sherman had fewer magnification settings than those fitted to German tanks, their gunners were able to use a secondary periscope that featured a far larger field of view than their German counterparts.

T4 High-Velocity Armor Piercing (HVAP) ammunition became available in September 1944 for the 76 mm gun. The projectile contained a tungsten penetrator surrounded by a lightweight aluminum body and ballistic windshield, which gave it a higher velocity and more penetrating power. The increased penetration of HVAP allowed the 76 mm gun to match the Panther's 7.5 cm KwK 42 APCR shot. However, its performance was heavily degraded by sloped armor such as the Panther's glacis. Because of tungsten shortages, HVAP rounds were constantly in short supply. Priority was given to U.S. tank destroyer units and over half of the 18,000 projectiles received were not compatible with the 76 mm gun M1, being fitted into the cartridge case of the M10 tank destroyer's 3-inch gun M7. Most Shermans carried only a few rounds at any one time, and some units never received any.

The British anticipated future developments in German armor and began development of a  antitank gun even before its 57 mm predecessor entered service. Out of expediency and also driven by delays in their new tank designs, they mounted the powerful  Ordnance QF 17-pounder gun in a standard 75 mm M4 Sherman turret. This conversion became the Sherman Firefly. Like the U.S. M1 gun, the 17 pdr was also a 76 mm gun, but the British piece used a more voluminous cartridge case containing a much bigger propellant charge. In late 1943, the British offered the 17-pounder to the U.S. Army for use in their M4 tanks. General Devers insisted on comparison tests between the 17-pounder and the U.S. 90 mm gun. The tests were finally done on March 25 and May 23, 1944; they seemed to show the 90 mm gun was equal to or better than the 17-pounder. By then, production of the 76 mm-armed M4 and the 90 mm-armed M36 were both underway and U.S. Army interest in the 17-pounder waned. Late in 1944, the British began to produce tungsten sabot rounds for the 17-pounder, which could readily breach the armor of even the Tiger II; these were not as accurate as standard rounds and not generally available.

After the heavy tank losses of the Battle of the Bulge, in January 1945, General Eisenhower asked that no more 75 mm M4s be sent to Europe: only 76 mm M4s were wanted. Interest in mounting the British 17-pounder in U.S. Shermans flared anew. In February 1945, the U.S. Army began sending 75 mm M4s to England for conversion to the 17-pounder. Approximately 100 conversions were completed by the beginning of May. By then, the end of the war in Europe was clearly in sight, and the U.S. Army decided the logistical difficulties of adding a new ammunition caliber to the supply system was not warranted. None of the converted 17-pounder M4s was deployed in combat by the U.S., and it is unclear what happened to most of them, although some were given to the British as part of Lend-Lease post-war.

The tank destroyer doctrine
General Lesley J. McNair was head of the Army Ground Forces from 1942 to 1944. McNair, a former artilleryman, advocated for the role of the tank destroyer (TD) within the U.S. Army. In McNair's opinion, tanks were to exploit breakthroughs and support infantry, while masses of attacking hostile tanks were to be engaged by tank destroyer units, which were composed of a mix of self-propelled and towed anti-tank guns. Self-propelled tank destroyers, called "gun motor carriages" (as were any U.S. Army self-propelled armored vehicles mounting an artillery piece of heavy caliber) were similar to tanks but were lightly armored with open-topped turrets. The tank destroyers were supposed to be faster and carry a more powerful anti-tank gun than tanks (although in reality tanks often received more powerful guns before tank destroyers did) and armor was sacrificed for speed. Armored Force and Tank Destroyer Force doctrine were developed separately, and it was not against Armored Force doctrine for friendly tanks to engage hostile tanks that appeared while attacking or defending; tank destroyers were to engage numbers of enemy tanks that broke through friendly lines.

McNair approved the 76 mm upgrade to the M4 Sherman and production of the 90 mm gun-armed M36 tank destroyer, but he at first staunchly opposed mass production of the T20 medium tank series and its descendants, the T25 and T26 (which would eventually become the M26 Pershing) during the crucial period of 1943 because they did not meet the two criteria of the Army Ground Forces for accepting new equipment; they were not "battle worthy," and he saw no "battle need" for them. In fall 1943, Lieutenant General Devers, commander of U.S. forces in the European Theater of Operations (ETO), asked for 250 T26 tanks for use in the invasion of France; McNair refused, citing the fact that he believed the M4 was adequate. Devers appealed all the way to the War Department, and Major General Russell L. Maxwell, the Assistant Chief of Staff G-4 of the War Department General Staff, ordered the 250 tanks built in December 1943. McNair finally relented in his opposition, but still opposed mass production; his Army Ground Forces even asked for the tanks to be "down-gunned" from 90 mm to 75 or 76 mm in April 1944, believing the 76 mm gun was capable of performing satisfactorily. General George C. Marshall then summarily ordered the tanks to be provided to the ETO as soon as possible. Soon after the Normandy invasion in June 1944, General Dwight D. Eisenhower urgently requested heavy tanks, but McNair's continued opposition to mass production due to persistent serious mechanical problems with the vehicles delayed their procurement. That same month, the War Department reversed course and completely overruled the Army Ground Forces when making their tank production plan for 1945. 7,800 tanks were to be built, of which 2,060 were to be T26s armed with 90 mm guns, 2,728 were to be T26s armed with 105 mm howitzers and 3,000 were to be M4A3 Sherman tanks armed with 105 mm howitzers. As a part of the plan, the British requested 750 90 mm-armed T26s and 200 105 mm-armed T26s. General McNair was killed in a botched air support mission in July 1944, and the path to production for the T26 tank became somewhat clearer. General Marshall intervened again and the tanks were eventually brought into full production. However, only a few T26 tanks (by then designated M26) saw combat beginning in February 1945, too late to have any effect on the battlefield.

Variants

The Sherman, like its M3 predecessor, was one of the first tanks to feature a gyroscopically stabilized gun and sight. The stabilization was only in the vertical plane; the mechanism could not slew the turret. The utility of the stabilization is debatable, with some saying it was useful for its intended purpose, others that it was useful only for using the sights for stabilized viewing on the move. Some operators disabled the stabilizer.

The 75 mm gun also had an effective canister round that functioned as a large shotgun. In the close fighting of the French bocage of Normandy, the U.S. Army's 2nd Armored Division tanks used Culin Hedgerow Cutters fitted to their tanks to push three tanks together through a hedgerow. The flank tanks would clear the back of the hedgerow on their side with canister rounds while the center tank would engage and suppress known or suspected enemy positions on the next hedgerow. This approach permitted surprisingly fast progress through the very tough and well-defended hedgerows in Normandy. Over 500 sets of these were fitted to US armored vehicles, and many fitted to various British tanks (where they were called "prongs").

The 75 mm gun had a white phosphorus shell originally intended for use as an artillery marker to help with targeting. M4 tank crews discovered that the shell could also be used against the Tiger and Panther—when the burning white phosphorus adhered to the German tanks, their excellent optics would be blinded and the acrid smoke would get sucked inside the vehicle, making it difficult or impossible for the crew to breathe. This, and the fear of fire starting or spreading inside the tank, would sometimes cause the crew to abandon the tank. There were several recorded instances where white phosphorus shells defeated German tanks in this fashion.

M4 Shermans armed with the 105 mm M4 howitzer were employed as a three-vehicle "assault gun" platoon under the tank battalion headquarters company along with another one in each medium tank company (a total of six tanks in the battalion) to provide close fire support and smoke. Armored infantry battalions were also eventually issued three of 105 mm Shermans in the headquarters company. The 105 mm-armed variants were issued the M67 high-explosive anti-tank (HEAT) round; although very effective the low muzzle velocity made hitting enemy armor difficult. The 105 mm Shermans were not equipped with a power-traversing turret, and this resulted in complaints from soldiers in the field. An upgrade was not available before the end of the war.

Armor

Turret

Later models of the M4A1, M4A2 and M4A3 Sherman tanks were equipped with the T80 turret developed for the T23 tank and the new 76 mm gun. Combat experience indicated that the single hatch in the three-man 75 mm gun turret was inadequate for timely evacuation, so Ordnance added a loader's hatch beside the commander's beginning in late 1943. All 76 mm gun turrets had two roof hatches.

Hull

The M4, M4A1, early production M4A2, and early production M4A3 possessed protruding cast "hatchway" structures that allowed the driver and assistant driver's hatches to fit in front of the turret ring. In these areas, the effect of the glacis plate's slope was greatly reduced. The new design improved overall ballistic protection by eliminating the "hatchways", while also allowing for larger hatches for the driver and bow gunner. The cast hull M4A1 for the most part retained its previous glacis shape even after the larger hatches were introduced; the casting, irrespective of the larger hatches, sat 37 to 55 degrees from the vertical, with the large majority of the piece sitting closer to a 55-degree angle.

The transmission housing was rounded, made of three cast sections bolted together or cast as one piece. The M4 had a hatch on the hull bottom to dispose of spent shell casings and to provide an emergency escape route. In the Pacific, Marines often used this Sherman feature in reverse to recover wounded infantry under fire.

Effectiveness
The armor of the Sherman was ineffective against most Axis tanks (Tanks like the Panzer Ausf IV fitted with 2.95in KwK 40 cannons and above.) Along with anti-tank weapon fire early in the war during multiple occasions. So it was decided it needed a compound angle to resist later German tank and anti-tank guns. The distinctive protruding "hatchways" of the early Sherman compromised the 56 degree-angled glacis plate, making them weak points where the effect of the glacis plate's slope was greatly reduced. In 1943, to make the thickness of these areas equal with the rest of the glacis plate,  appliqué armor plates were fitted in front of them.

Although the later-model German medium and heavy tanks were greatly feared, Buckley opined "The vast majority of German tanks encountered in Normandy were either inferior or merely equal to the Sherman." (Panzer III or Panzer IV)

Research for tank casualties in Normandy from 6 June to 10 July 1944 conducted by the British No. 2 Operational Research Section concluded that from a sample of 40 Sherman tanks, 33 tanks burned (82 percent) and 7 tanks remained unburned following an average of 1.89 penetrations. In comparison, from a sample of 5 Panzer IVs, 4 tanks burned (80 percent) and 1 tank remained unburned, following an average of 1.5 penetrations. The Panther tank burned 14 times (63 percent) from a sample of 22 tanks and following 3.24 penetrations, while the Tiger burned 4 times (80 percent) out of a sample of 5 tanks following 3.25 penetrations. John Buckley, using a case study of the British 8th and 29th Armoured Brigades, found that of their 166 Shermans knocked out in combat during the Normandy campaign, 94 (56.6 percent) burned out. Buckley also notes that an American survey carried out concluded that 65% of tanks burned out after being penetrated. United States Army research proved that the major reason for this was the stowage of main gun ammunition in the vulnerable sponsons above the tracks. A U.S. Army study in 1945 concluded that only 10–15 percent of wet stowage Shermans burned when penetrated, compared to 60–80 percent of the older dry-stowage Shermans. As a burned tank was unrecoverable, it was prudent in combat to continue to fire at a tank until it burned.

At first, a partial remedy to ammunition fires in the M4 was found in 1943 by welding  appliqué armor plates to the sponson sides over the ammunition stowage bins, though there was doubt that these had any effect. Later models moved ammunition stowage to the hull floor, with water jackets surrounding each storage bin. The practice, known as "wet stowage", reduced the chance of fire after a hit to about 15 percent. The Sherman gained grim nicknames like "Zippo" (after the cigarette lighter), and "Ronson" (because "it lights the first time, every time"; this story has been challenged because the Ronson company did not begin using the slogan until the 1950s and the average soldier didn't have a Ronson) and "Tommycooker" (by the Germans, who referred to British soldiers as "Tommies"; a tommy cooker was a World War I-era trench stove). Fuel fires occasionally occurred, but such fires were far less common and less deadly than ammunition fires. In many cases, the fuel tank of the Sherman was found intact after a fire. Tankers described "fierce, blinding jets of flame", which is consistent with burning pressurized hydraulic fluid, but not gasoline-related fires.

Upgrades
Upgrades included the rectangular armor patches protecting ammunition stowage mentioned above, and smaller armor patches in front of each of the protruding hatchway structures in the glacis in an attempt to mitigate their ballistic weakness. Field improvisations included placing sandbags, spare track links, concrete, wire mesh, or even wood for increased protection against shaped-charge rounds. While mounting sandbags around a tank had little effect against high-velocity anti-tank gunfire it was thought to provide standoff protection against HEAT weapons, primarily the German Panzerfaust anti-tank grenade launcher and the 88 mm caliber Panzerschreck anti-tank rocket launcher. In the only study known to have been done to test the use of sandbags, on March 9, 1945, officers of the 1st Armored Group tested standard Panzerfaust 60s against sandbagged M4s; shots against the side blew away the sandbags and still penetrated the side armor, whereas shots fired at an angle against the front plate blew away some of the sandbags but failed to penetrate the armor. Earlier, in the summer of 1944, General Patton, informed by his ordnance officers that sandbags were useless and that the machines' chassis suffered from the extra weight, had forbidden the use of sandbags. Following the clamor for better armor and firepower after the losses of the Battle of the Bulge, Patton ordered extra armor plates salvaged from knocked-out American and German tanks welded to the turrets and hulls of tanks of his command. Approximately 36 of this up-armored M4s were supplied to each of the three armored divisions of the Third Army in the spring of 1945.

M4A3E2

The gun mantlet had an additional  of armor welded on giving a total thickness of 177.8 mm. It was originally to be armed with the 76 mm gun, but the 75 mm was preferred for infantry support and was used, although some were later upgraded to use the 76 mm. The higher weight required changing the transmission gear ratios to reduce maximum speed to 22 mph, and crews were warned not to let the suspension "bottom" too violently. 254 were built at the Fisher Tank Arsenal from May to July 1944, and arrived in Europe in the fall of 1944, being employed throughout the remainder of the fighting in various roles. They were considered "highly successful".

Mobility

In its initial specifications for a replacement for the M3 medium tank, the U.S. Army restricted Sherman's height, width, and weight so that it could be transported via typical bridges, roads, railroads, and landing craft without special accommodation. Army Regulation 850-15 initially restricted the widths of a tank to 103 inches (2.62 m) and its weight to 30 tons (27.2 t) . This greatly aided the strategic, logistical, and tactical flexibility and mobility of all Allied armored forces using the Sherman.

A long-distance service trial conducted in Britain in 1943 compared diesel and gasoline Shermans to Cromwell tanks (Rolls-Royce Meteor engine) and Centaur (Liberty L-12). The British officer commanding the trial concluded:

The Sherman had good speed both on and off-road. Off-road performance varied. In the desert, Sherman's rubber-block tracks performed well, while in the confined, hilly terrain of Italy, the smaller, more nimble Sherman could often cross terrain that some heavy German tanks could not. Albert Speer recounted in his autobiography Inside the Third Reich:

However, while this may have held compared with the first generation German tanks, such as the Panzer III and Panzer IV, comparative testing with the second generation wide-tracked German tanks (Panther and Tiger) conducted by the Germans at their Kummersdorf testing facility, as well as by the U.S. 2nd Armored Division, proved otherwise. The M4's initial tracks were 16.5 inches wide. This produced ground pressure of 14 pounds per square inch. U.S. crews found that on soft ground, the narrow tracks of the Sherman gave poorer ground pressure compared to the Panther and Tiger.

Because of their wider tracks and use of the characteristic Schachtellaufwerk interleaved and overlapped road wheels (as used on pre-war origin German half-track vehicles), the Panther and Tiger had greater mobility on soft ground because of their greater flotation (i.e., lower ground pressure). Lieutenant Colonel Wilson M. Hawkins of the 2nd Armored Division wrote the following comparing the U.S. M4 Sherman and the German Panther in a report to Allied headquarters:

This was backed up in an interview with Technical Sergeant Willard D. May of the 2nd Armored Division who commented: "I have taken instructions on the Mark V [Panther] and have found, first, it is easily as maneuverable as the Sherman; second the flotation exceeds that of the Sherman."

Staff Sergeant and tank platoon sergeant Charles A. Carden completes the comparison in his report:

The U.S. Army issued extended end connectors ("duckbills") to add width to the standard tracks as a stopgap solution. Duckbills began to reach front-line tank battalions in fall 1944 but were original factory equipment for the heavy M4A3E2 Jumbo to compensate for the extra weight of armor. The M4A3(76)W HVSS Shermans and other late models with wider-tracked suspensions corrected these problems but formed only a small proportion of the tanks in service even in 1945.

Reliability

M4A1
In September 1942 the British developed some potential improvements and tested the tanks.

After  the springs of the left front bogie broke, considered typical for this type of suspension. Oil accumulated on the floor of the engine compartment during driving. The engine periodically stalled under high load due to interrupted fuel supply. It was found that the engine had been built and installed incorrectly. Upon disassembly carbon deposits were found on the working surfaces of the cylinders; they were very worn out after only 65 hours of operation or  run. In the absence of a replacement by October 10, the engine was put back in the tank; the revised fuel system was supposed to improve the stalling engine.

In November 1943, several M4A1 Shermans were tested at the American proving ground to test British innovations. On one of them, 37 experimental changes were made, on the second – 47, on the third – 53. In total, 60 changes were developed and implemented for the Shermans, most of which were considered successful after a 600-mile run and firing.

M4A2
In Africa, the British engines ran for 700–900 miles (1130–1450 km), or 180–200 hours. The engine had to be inspected and repaired after 100 hours, which significantly extended its service life, but there was not enough time for such work, and among crews, it was believed that there was little benefit in the procedure. The engine left much to be desired, as evidenced by attempts at modifications in the Eighth Army, which did not affect the reliability of the tank. The Shermans also had other defects, including broken wiring, breaking ignition coils, and clutch rods.

The improved return roller design performed much better than that which the early Sherman production inherited from the M3. A February 1943 report described a unit where there were no broken bogey coil springs even after a 1,000-mile (1,600 km) march. The tracks however suffered; the rubber flaked off and after a run of 600 miles (970 km) the tracks were unusable. Some units rode on tracks without the rubber pads, but the rubber tires of the rollers wore down faster. The introduction of radially groove tires helped to cope with overheating when driving fast in the desert, but de-lamination of the tires still led to cracks in the rollers after 300 miles (480 km).

The M4A2 performed very well in hot climates in general. The British sent as many of these as possible to the Mediterranean theater, retaining a minimum of vehicles for training in the UK. Complaints began to come in about carbon fouling of the injectors due to oil getting into the combustion chamber.

Other mechanical problems were rare and were most common in the left engine. Shermans suffered from wear to tire trackpads which were mitigated by changing to all-metal tracks and ventilated rollers. The tanks proved to be very reliable with proper operation. In June 1943, it was noted that the average service life was estimated at 1,500 miles (2,400 km). The M4A2 was rated “very high”, while the M4A1 was rated “high”.

The Soviet 6th Guards Tank Army determined the lifespan of their M4A2 Shermans to be  or 250–300 hours, comparable to the T-34.

M4A3
The Ford V-8 engined M4A3s took part in the 1943 'survival' race. On average, the engines worked for 255 hours, though one failed after 87 hours of running. Three tanks were taken out of the test at 187, 247, and 295 operating hours due to reasons unrelated to the engine. The report noted that even disqualified motors could be returned to service by replacing only one part: the rest were still in excellent condition. Of all the Ford engines, it turned out to be the most service-friendly. The M4A3 tanks covered a greater distance than other Shermans: ten vehicles covered 20,346 miles (32,743 km) in total (half on-the-road off-road road) over 2,388 hours  -an impressive achievement.

The M4A3 continued to lead to reliability through further testing. On tests in the winter and spring of 1944, one tank covered  in 203 hours and 25 minutes. An M4 failed after only 15 hours and 10 minutes and was replaced by another. The M4A1 lasted 27 hours 15 minutes, and the M4A4 covered 1,343 miles (2,161 km) in 149 hours and 35 minutes.

Around the same time, another reliability test began, albeit on a smaller scale of 20 Shermans of various types including four M4A3. The time spent on repairs was carefully measured: on average, the M4A3 took 110 hours to service the engine, which was better than the M4A1 (132 hours) or M4A2 (143 hours), but more than double the average of 45 hours on maintenance of the Chrysler multibank by M4A4 crews. M4A3 remained superior in transmission time: 112 hours versus 340 hours for the M4A4. In terms of suspension, the tanks turned out to be approximately equal. None of the tanks with Ford engines passed the entire route: they dropped out after 293, 302, 347, and 350 hours of running. Only three Chrysler engines and one General Motors diesel engine coped with the task.

Although M4A3s were not in service with other armies, some were supplied to the Allies for review. In early January 1943,  a new M4A3 was provided to the British Fighting Vehicle Proving Establishment. By January 16, it began trials. The engine failed after 495 miles (800 km). A new engine was delivered by the end of February. This gave more power and better performance and despite multiple problems, the tank achieved 2,000 miles (3,220 km). The British considered the M4A3 a very reliable tank but far from perfect.
An upgraded vehicle was tested in the spring of 1944; it covered over 3,000 miles (4,863 km) through several defects accumulated over the course of the run. The M4A3 was considered an outstanding vehicle for its reliability.

M4A4
In October 1942, five M3A4s and five M4A4s were tested in the California desert, which was a monstrous test for vehicles with an unsatisfactory cooling system. Constant breakdowns of auxiliary engine units put an end to the tank's combat career in the US Army. By the spring of 1943, the recommendations given by the Armored Council had been implemented, and 10 M4A4 tanks had been driven to a 4,000-miles (6,440 km) range. The average service life of the A57 engine reached 240 hours. M4A4 tanks took second place in reliability after the M4A3 with a Ford GAA engine (255 hours), ahead of diesel M4A2 (225 hours) and M4A1 radial (218 hours). The M4A4 was the easiest to maintain.

Additional tests of four M4A4s from October 8, 1943, to February 14, 1944, showed even better results: one engine broke down after 339 hours, three others worked 400 hours with less than 10% power loss.
3 of 4 M4A4 could finish the Armored Council test and drive for 4,000-miles (6,440 km).

Despite the positive outcomes of additional testing, oil and fuel consumption was still too high for the engine to be recommended for service in the American army. Production of the M4A4 was discontinued on October 10, 1943, and it was declared obsolete in 1945.

Engine

Diesel M4A2s had a significant superiority over the R975 gasoline engines. The first M4A3 tank with a Ford GAA V8 gasoline engine, surpassing the R975 in all aspects, was assembled in May 1942, and even the M4A4 had a more reliable engine.

The R975 engine began to lose relevance once the vehicle was put into service. The R975 was initially powered by high-octane aviation gasoline. With the entry of the United States into the war, it was necessary to change to a lower grade fuel. To maintain performance, the maximum octane number of fuel for the new engine was limited to 80. In April 1942, an engine with a compression ratio of 5.7 was tested, which was considered acceptable. The nominal revs increased from 1200 to 1800 per minute. The new engine used a richer fuel mixture and had a larger combustion chamber.

Engines were compared in large-scale tests at the Aberdeen Proving Grounds in the winter of 1943–1944 with four examples each of M4A1, M4A2, M4A3, and M4A4. The endpoint was 4,000 miles or 400 hours run time. Faults with anything except the motor were repaired and testing resumed; only critical damage or loss of a third of its original power took the engine out of the competition.

During the tests, it took 132 hours to service the R-975 in the M4A1, 143 hours for the GM diesel M4A2, 110 hours for the Ford GAA M4A3, and 45 hours for the multibank M4A4. None of the R975 engines reached the 200 hours mark, failing on average after 166 hours. It was noted that a lot of time was spent on servicing the air filters for the R-975; over 23 days of testing, 446 man-hours were spent on cleaning and repairing them.

An M4 with the R975-C1 engine was tested a year later over a 5,000-mile (8,050 km) test in which the engine had to be replaced three times. In addition, there were transmission and suspension problems. The filters performed poorly: it was noted that sand and dust severely spoil the engine and other units.

Work to improve the reliability of the R975 engine led to quite significant changes, resulting in the R975-C4. The engine torque went from 1800 Nm at 1900 pm to 2040 Nm. Older engines were upgraded to the later model during a major overhaul.

The new engine was approved for production on June 17, 1943, with 200 units ordered for the Gun Motor Carriage T70 tank destroyer. In October 1943 the British demanded that it be provided for their Shermans. Tests in February 1944 on the M4A1 tank that as well as increased power: oil consumption dropped by 35% and cylinder temperature by 50 °C.

The speed increased: the M4A1 with the new engine covered 1.5 miles (2.4 km) of paved track in 4 minutes and 45 seconds – 47 seconds faster than the tank with the R975-C1 engine. Tests have also shown increased reliability. The three new R975-C4s installed on the M4A1 were withdrawn from testing after 177, 219, and 231 hours, respectively, and the R975-C1, upgraded to the C4 standard, worked 222 hours on the M4 tank. Compared to its predecessor, the service life of the engines has increased, albeit only slightly.

In 1943, the Americans conducted large-scale trials of all types of Shermans. In total, 40 tanks were admitted to them: 10 each M4A1, M4A2, M4A3, and M4A4. The target was 400 hours or 4000 miles before the engine failed. The rest of the tank units could be repaired an unlimited number of times.

By April 23, 1943, ten M4A2 had covered a total of 16,215 miles (8229 miles on-road and 7,986 miles off-road), operating for 1,825 hours. Fuel consumption of the M4A2 was lower than that of other Shermans: 1.1 mpg (214 liters per 100 km) on the highway, and 0.5 miles per gallon (470 liters per 100 km) on off-road. On average, tanks consumed 0.81 quarts (0.76 liters) of oil per engine hour. The tests ended on May 11. By that time, the M4A2 had covered 22,126 miles, running 2,424 hours. The M4A1 and M4A4 both made , while the M4A3 made .

In terms of reliability, the M4A2 was in third place. The first engine failed after 75 hours of operation. Two engines worked all 400 hours, while one was in good condition, and the other was on its last legs. On average, the engines worked for 225 hours before the breakdown of the internal units. Only the R-975 engines showed themselves worse than the GM 6–71 (average service life of 218 hours). Ford GAA (255 hours) and Chrysler A57 (240 hours) proved to be more reliable. In terms of time spent on maintenance, the M4A2 came in second.

The tanks continued to race for survival. At the end of 1943, 20 vehicles entered trials at once: four M4A1, M4A2, M4A3, M4A4, and new M4E1 with an experimental engine. The Shermans drove on three types of surfaces: fine loose sand, clayey stony ground, and highways. As in previous tests, during the run, the repairmen could change any units, and only the breakdown of internal components and engine parts disqualified the tank.

By December 27, all M4A1s (average mileage of 166 hours) and one M4A3 were out of order, but not a single tank with a diesel engine. By February 18, tests for the M4A2 ended. Three tanks failed after 276, 278, and 353 hours, respectively, while one covered 4295 miles in 403 hours and was still on the move. From M4A3, one tank also remained on the move, but with a rather modest mileage, since it had been under repair for a long time. Of the four M4A4s, one tank broke down, and the M4E1 was removed from testing – it was decided that the RD1820 engine would not go into a large series anyway.

By March 18, the tanks had finished testing. The M4A4 turned out to be the most reliable again: out of four tanks, three reached the finish line. The M4A4 engine also took the least time to service: 45 hours per tank. M4A2 was in second place, as the last M4A3 still broke down, and did not cover the required distance. However, the maintenance of the GM 6–71 engine took 143 hours – more than the M4A3 (110 hours) or M4A1 (132 hours). The M4A2 also did not shine in servicing the transmission group: it took 220 hours to take care of each tank (only the M4A4 with 340 hours did more). In terms of suspension service time, the tank was at the level of other "Shermans": 205 hours. A total of 327 hours of a run of the average diesel Sherman took 594.5 hours of mechanics' work.

US variants

Vehicles that used the M4 chassis or hull derived from M4:

3in Gun Motor Carriage M10 also known as Wolverine – tank destroyer
90 mm Gun Motor Carriage M36 also known as Jackson – tank destroyer
105 mm Howitzer Motor Carriage M7B1 also known as Priest – self-propelled artillery
155 mm Gun Motor Carriage M12 – self-propelled gun, paired in service with the Cargo Carrier M30 (also derived from the Sherman)
155 mm Gun Motor Carriage M40 – 155 mm self-propelled artillery (armed with the Long Tom artillery piece). Other artillery vehicles that share the same chassis include:  HMC M43,  MMC T94, and Cargo Carrier T30
Flame Tank Sherman
M4A2 with bow mounted E4-5 flamethrower
POA-CWS-H1-H2 (US Army) M4-3A5R (USMC) "Mark 1" CWS in theater modifications
POA-CWS-H5 (US Army), M4-3A-8R (USMC)  with coaxial H1A-H5A flamethrower.
M4-2B1E9
Rocket Artillery Sherman – T34 Calliope, T40 Whizbang, and other Sherman rocket launchers
Engineer tanks – D-8, M1, and M1A1 dozers, M4 Doozit, Mobile Assault Bridge, and T1E3 Aunt Jemima mine roller and other mine-clearers
Armored recovery vehicle – M32 Tank Recovery Vehicle and M74 Tank Recovery Vehicle
Artillery tractors – M34 and M35 prime movers

Foreign variants and use

The Sherman was extensively supplied through Lend-Lease to Britain, the Soviet Union, China, and Free France. Britain received 17,181 in various models, mostly M4А2s and M4A4s (5,041 Sherman III and 7,167 V, respectively), of which over 2000 were re-equipped with a more powerful gun to become the Sherman Firefly. The Soviet Union was shipped 4,065 M4 (M4A2s – 1,990 with 75 mm- and 2,073 with 76 mm-armed versions, 2 M4A4s), or 4,102 M4 (2,007 with 75 mm- and 2,095 with 76 mm versions). Еnrolled 3,664. The Free French were the third largest recipient, being given 755 during 1943 and 1944. At least 57 (or 157) Shermans were also delivered to other U.S. allies.

A similar vehicle was developed in Canada from January 1941, known as the Ram tank. Like the Sherman, this was based on the M3 Lee's chassis and powertrain upgraded to have a turret, although it used a new turret of Canadian design. One improvement was the use of all-steel 'CDP' (Canadian Dry Pin) tracks, which although an inch narrower than the early M4 steel and rubber pad tracks, were cheaper to produce and gave better traction. Suspension units and roadwheels remained the M3 vertical volute pattern, with the idler above the mounting bracket, rather than the M4 development with the idler moved behind the mounting bracket to give more room for suspension travel. The Ram had a distinctive turret with a bolted flat-faced mantlet and the UK 6 pdr gun, with the hull machine gunner housed in a rotating turret based on the M3 'Lee' cupola, rather than the simpler ball-mount that was becoming universal for tank hull guns. Production facilities for the Ram were constructed at the Montreal Locomotive Works, with the aid of Alco, but the large armor castings for turret and hull were supplied by General Steel Castings in the US. Greater Sherman production and availability meant that the Ram was never used in action as a gun tank, being either used for training or converted to Kangaroo armored personnel carriers.

A later Canadian medium tank, produced in late 1943, was the Grizzly, an adaption of the Sherman M4A1. This differed only in details, such as the CDP tracks, British radio equipment, and the British 2" smoke mortar in the turret roof. 188 were produced.

After World War II, Shermans were supplied to some NATO armies; Shermans were used by the U.S. and allied forces in the Korean War.

Shermans also went to Israel. The Israeli up-gunned it to 75 mm M-50 and 105 mm armed M-51 Super Shermans, which were remarkable examples of how a long obsolete design can be upgraded for front-line use. They saw combat in the 1967 Six-Day War, fighting Soviet World War II-era armor like the T-34-85, and also in the 1973 Yom Kippur War, proving effective even against newer, heavier Soviet tanks like the T-54 and T-55.

Paraguay retired three Shermans from the Regimiento Escolta Presidencial (REP, "Presidential Escort Regiment") in 2018, which marked the end of service of the final Sherman tanks in use anywhere in the world.

Former operators

: For testing purposes only.
: M4A3E4 Sherman was used.
 80 M4, M4A1 Shermans received

: M4A3E4 Sherman supplied by USA.

: 755

: From post-WWII.
: Inherited from the Netherlands following independence in 1949.
: From post-WWII; M4A3E8 Sherman supplied by the USA.

: As Beutepanzer,captured vehicles.

: M4A3 (105)
: Received M4A1E6 Shermans from USA.
: Retired in April 2018.

: M4A3E4 Shermans used.

: 20 M4A3E8 (Marine Corps, 1951), 388 M4A3E8 (Army, 1954). Retired (1971, replaced by M48 Patton).
: 3,664.
: For testing purposes only.
: One turretless M4A1 Sherman.

: 34 delivered in January 1945.
: 17,181.
: Original operator, retired in 1957.
: 599 M4A3E4 Shermans received during the Informbiro period.

See also

SCR-508
Detroit Arsenal Tank Plant
List of land vehicles of the U.S. Armed Forces
Vickers Tank Periscope MK.IV
Allied technological cooperation during World War II
G-numbers
M50 Super Sherman
Rhino tank

Tanks of comparable role, performance and era

Argentine Nahuel DL 43
Australian Sentinel
Australian Thunderbolt
British Cromwell
British Comet – Comparable to the "Easy Eight" variant
Canadian Grizzly I
German Panzer III (with 7.5 cm gun)
German Panzer IV
German Panther – Comparable to the“Easy Eight” variant 
Hungarian Turán III
Italian Carro Armato P 40
Italian P43 (proposal)
Japanese Type 3 Chi-Nu
Romanian 1942 medium tank (proposal)
Soviet T-34 – T-34-85 variant comparable to the "Easy Eight" variant
Swedish Stridsvagn m/42

Notes

References

Sources

External links

The Sherman Tank Site
Interview with Soviet Tanker Dmitriy Loza detailing the comparative utility of Shermans in the 6th Guards Tank Army at www.iremember.ru
M4 Sherman Photos and Walk Arounds on Prime Portal
Sherman Register
OnWar
World War II vehicles
Sherman at israeli-weapons.com
Top Ten Tanks- #10: M-4 Sherman American Heroes Channel on youtube
M42B1 Sherman at U.S. Veterans Memorial Museum
Poor Defense: Sherman Tanks

Medium tanks of the United States
Military vehicles introduced from 1940 to 1944
World War II tanks of the United States
World War II medium tanks
History of the tank